Rough'n Tumble (foaled in 1948) was an American Thoroughbred racehorse who won the Santa Anita Derby and became what Bloodhorse called "one of the most successful stallions in Florida breeding history."

Rough'n Tumble was purchased privately for less than $5000 by Frances Genter, who entrusted his race conditioning to trainer Melvin Calvert.

As a two-year-old, Rough'n Tumble won the Primer Stakes at Arlington Park and at three, he captured the most important race for his age group  in California: the Santa Anita Derby

Stud record
Among Rough'n Tumble's best progeny were Dr. Fager (b. 1964), a U.S. Racing Hall of Fame millionaire; My Dear Girl (b. 1957), the 1959 American Champion Two-Year-Old Filly; plus multiple stakes winners Conestoga, Flag Raiser, Ruffled Feathers, and Yes You Will.

Pedigree

References

1948 racehorse births
Racehorses bred in the United States
Racehorses trained in the United States
Thoroughbred family 1-o
Chefs-de-Race